is a railway station in the city of Yamagata, Yamagata Prefecture, Japan, operated by East Japan Railway Company (JR East).

Lines
Takase Station is served by the Senzan Line, and is located 52.4 rail kilometers from the terminus of the line at Sendai Station.

Station layout
The station has one side platform serving a single bi-directional track. The station is unattended.

History
Takase Station opened on July 1, 1950. The station was absorbed into the JR East network upon the privatization of JNR on April 1, 1987. A new station building was completed in 1999.

Surrounding area
Murayama-Takase Post Office

See also
List of railway stations in Japan

External links

 JR East Station information 

Stations of East Japan Railway Company
Railway stations in Yamagata Prefecture
Senzan Line
Railway stations in Japan opened in 1950
Yamagata, Yamagata